Michael Graham Cox (6 January 1938 – 30 April 1995) was an English actor.

Career
Born at Wolverhampton, and educated at Wolverhampton Grammar School, Cox moved to London after graduating in Music with German from Bristol University in the 1960s. First living at a flat in Oxford Street, he soon settled at Randolph Crescent W9, later being relocated by The Paddington Church Commissioners to a garden flat around the corner at 32 Clifton Gardens close to his favourite pubs The Warrington, The Prince Alfred, and The Warwick Castle, where he frequently socialised with friends including Jane Morgan, Tony Osoba, Michael Aspel and John Inman.

He is best remembered for voicing Boromir in the 1978 film The Lord of the Rings and the same character in the 1981 radio serialisation, as well as voicing Bigwig in the feature film Watership Down. But his 'Palmer' in Ken Russell's 1969 'Women in Love' is arguably his career highlight.

In 1982 he appeared as Wally Brabham in Minder episode 10 of series 3; "Broken Arrow".

Cox had a minor role in Richard Attenborough's A Bridge Too Far and Cry Freedom. He appeared many times on stage and in television dramas such as Grange Hill, as kindly teacher Mr. Butterworth. He also starred with Derek Nimmo and Rosemary Leach in the TV sitcom Life Begins at Forty. Other BBC radio dramas produced and directed by Jane Morgan (a lifelong, friend and colleague) included her Dickens series.

Stratford roles with the Old Vic on tour of the late 1950s embedded Cox as Shakespearean. West End stage roles in early 1960s included Coward's 'Hay Fever' with Prunella Scales, Roland Culver. 1970s saw him at the Roundhouse with the Prospect Theatre's Histories tour. The 1970's and 1980s saw him as Antony to Delphine Seyrig's Cleopatra, and alongside James Bolam's King Lear, together with several other productions at The Young Vic, at The Cut.

Cox died on 30 April 1995 at a hospice in Wimbledon, following several strokes, diabetic complications and finally dementia, all alcohol induced. He was buried next to his brother John at the Catholic Diocese of Beaconsfield. His wife Davina Beswick, a fellow alumnus of Bristol Old Vic died on 31 July 2018 at Sudbury, Suffolk. Their only child, Dominic, a Cambridge-educated architect, John's only child Susan (his niece), and her mother June, survive him, residing in Western Kenya, and Banbury, Oxfordshire, respectively.

Filmography

References
 Good man Michael Graham Cox. Regular customer at ‘ Tsiakkoss and Charcoal’ kebab house Marylands Road W9 2Du. Always brought the party with him, practically the whole of Maida Vale; along came the late Alan Rickman, Ruby Wax, Lucian Freud….oh an Nora Batty too. Yes all the great and the Good. They all deserve a Cub Scout salute. Best Wishes, Michael Aristedou

External links
British Film Institute filmography

1938 births
1995 deaths
English male film actors
English male television actors
English male voice actors
20th-century English male actors